List of Guggenheim Fellowships awarded in 1990

References

1990
1990 awards